Sint Maarten, a constituent country of the Kingdom of the Netherlands, has a government formed by the monarch, represented by the governor, and the ministers. The prime minister presides the council of ministers. Executive power is exercised by the government. Legislative power is vested in both the government and parliament. The minister plenipotentiary is not part of the government and represents the Sint Maarten government in the Netherlands. The judiciary is independent of the executive and the legislature. The country is a parliamentary representative democratic country with a multi-party system. Sint Maarten has full autonomy on most matters, with the exceptions summed up in the Charter for the Kingdom of the Netherlands under the title "Kingdom affairs". The Constitution of Sint Maarten was ratified in September 2010, and entered into force on 10 October 2010.

Political movements 
Currently, there is a movement in Sint Maarten which aims to unite the island of Saint Martin.

Government

Executive power 
Executive power rests with a governor, and a prime minister heads a Cabinet. The governor of Sint Maarten is appointed for a six-year term by the monarch, and the prime minister and deputy prime minister are elected by the Staten for four-year terms.

|King
|Willem-Alexander
|
|30 April 2013
|-
|Governor
|Ajamu Baly
|
|10 October 2022
|}

The current cabinet is the Jacobs cabinet formed on 19 November 2019. It is the ninth since Sint Maarten became a country within the Kingdom of the Netherlands on 10 October 2010.

|Prime Minister
|Silveria Jacobs
|NA
|19 November 2019
|-
|Deputy Prime Minister & Minister of Public Housing, Spatial Planning, Environment and Infrastructure
|Egbert J. Doran
|NA
|28 March 2020
|-
|Minister of Finance
|Ardwell Irion
|NA
|19 November 2019
|-
|Minister of Justice
|Anna E. Richardson
|NA
|28 March 2020
|-
|Minister of Tourism, Economic Affairs, Transport and Telecommunications
|Roger A. Lawrence
|UP
|26 August 2021
|-
|Minister of Public Health, Labor and Social Affairs
|Omar E.C. Ottley
|UP
|20 April 2021
|-
|Minister of Education, Culture, Youth, and Sports
|drs. Rodolphe E. Samuel
|NA
|28 March 2020
|-
|Minister Plenipotentiary of Sint Maarten
|Rene Violenus
|NA
|28 March 2020
|}

Legislative power 
Legislative power is shared by the government and the legislature. The legislature or Staten is made up of 15 members elected by direct, popular vote to serve four-year terms.

Judicial power 
Sint Maarten's judicial system, which has mainly been derived from the Dutch system, operates independently of the legislature and the executive. Jurisdiction, including appeal, lies with the Common Court of Justice of Aruba, Curaçao, Sint Maarten, and of Bonaire, Sint Eustatius and Saba and the Supreme Court of the Netherlands.

Sint Maarten is the only part of the Netherlands where laws can be evaluated against the constitution. Such an evaluation is performed by the Constitutional Court of Sint Maarten after a request by the Ombudsman of Sint Maarten after the law is passed.

As for the legal profession, the Order of Lawyers Sint Maarten (Orde van Advocaten Sint Maarten) has existed since 1989. However, there is no indication as to how demographic groups, such as women, have fared in the legal field.

References

External links 
http://www.sintmaartengov.org - Official Web site